The 2019 Bommarito Automotive Group 500 was the fifteenth round of the 2019 IndyCar Series season, contested over 248 laps at the 1.25-mile (2 km) World Wide Technology Raceway in Madison, Illinois. Pole position was won by Josef Newgarden, his third pole of the season.  Takuma Sato would go on to win the race, his 2nd win of the season and 5th of his career. This race would also be the last podium for Tony Kanaan in his IndyCar career.

Results

Qualifying

Race

Notes:
 Points include 1 point for leading at least 1 lap during a race, an additional 2 points for leading the most race laps, and 1 point for Pole Position.

Championship standings after the race

Drivers' Championship standings

Manufacturer standings

 Note: Only the top five positions are included.

References

Bommarito Automotive Group 500
Bommarito Automotive Group 500
Bommarito Automotive Group 500